{{DISPLAYTITLE:C10H14O3}}
The molecular formula C10H14O3 (molar mass: 182.22 g/mol, exact mass: 182.0943 u) may refer to:

 Hagemann's ester, or ethyl-2-methyl-4-oxo-2-cyclohexenecarboxylate
 Mephenesin